Christchurch Meadow, or Christ Church Meadow, and in the singular or plural, may refer to:

 Christchurch Meadow, Belper, a football ground in Belper, Derbyshire, England
 Christ Church Meadow, Oxford, a meadow in Oxford, Oxfordshire, England
 Christchurch Meadows, Reading, a riverside park in Reading, Berkshire, England